The Kirby's tiger (Parantica kirbyi) is a species of nymphalid butterfly in the Danainae subfamily. It is found in Indonesia and Papua New Guinea.

The name honours William Forsell Kirby.

References

Parantica
Taxonomy articles created by Polbot
Butterflies described in 1894